was a Japanese painter of the Kanō school. One of the foremost Kanō painters, many of the best known Kanō works today are by Tan'yū.

Biography 
His original given name was Morinobu; he was the eldest son of Kanō Takanobu and grandson of Kanō Eitoku.

In 1617, Tan'yū was appointed by the Tokugawa shogunate to become the shogunate's first official painter. Over the following years, he was given many highly prestigious commissions. Over the 1620s and 1630s, he created a number of large-scale works for Edo Castle, Nijō Castle, Osaka Castle, Nagoya Castle, and Nikkō Tōshō-gū.

Prolific in a variety of painting styles, Tan'yū's most famous works are probably those he produced for these large-scale commissions. They are screens and panels, prime examples of the Momoyama style, depicting natural subjects such as tigers, birds and plants, in bright colors and with extensive use of gold leaf. The gold, often used to represent clouds, water, or other background elements, would reflect what little light was available indoors, brightening a castle's dark rooms.

Tan'yū was also accomplished, however, in monochrome ink painting based on the prototypical style of the Muromachi period, yamato-e compositions in a style similar to that of the Tosa school, and Chinese style scrolls. His most famous yamato-e work is a narrative handscroll depicting the life of Tokugawa Ieyasu, the first Tokugawa shōgun and major figure in Japanese history. It was after this commission, in 1640, that the artist first took on the "artist name" of Tan'yū.

In addition to being a highly honored and respected painter in his own right, Tan'yū was known as a collector and connoisseur of Chinese paintings. He made sketches and kept records of many of the paintings that passed through his studio, brought to him for authentication.

He died in 1674 at the age of 72.

See also
Kusumi Morikage

References

Kaputa, Catherine (1985). "Kanō Tan'yū." Kodansha Encyclopedia of Japan, Tokyo: Kodansha Ltd.

External links
Brief Biography of Kano Tanyu - Jyuluck-Do Corporation
Works in the collection of the Metropolitan Museum of Art.

1602 births
1674 deaths
17th-century Japanese people
17th-century Japanese artists
17th-century Japanese painters
Kanō school